30th Field Artillery Regiment can refer to:
30th Field Artillery Regiment (Canada)
30th Field Artillery Regiment (United States)